Polydiethylstilbestrol phosphate (PSP, PDSP) is an estrogen medication which has been used in scientific research and has been studied for use in veterinary medicine as a livestock growth promoter. It is a phosphate ester of diethylstilbestrol (DES) in the form of a polymer and is a polymeric form of fosfestrol (diethylstilbestrol diphosphate); PDSP acts as a long-lasting prodrug of DES. It has similarities to polyestradiol phosphate and polyestriol phosphate.

See also
 List of estrogen esters § Diethylstilbestrol esters
 Polytestosterone phloretin phosphate

References

Abandoned drugs
Copolymers
Phenols
Phosphate esters
Prodrugs
Stilbenoids
Synthetic estrogens
Veterinary drugs